The Star Beacon is a seven-day morning daily newspaper published in Ashtabula, Ohio, United States. It is owned by Community Newspaper Holdings Inc. It is published Monday through Friday, and a Weekend Edition delivered on Saturday mornings. It does publish a Sunday edition.

Its marketing slogan is "Your daily connection to the community".

References

External links
 Star Beacon Website

Newspapers published in Ohio
Mass media in Ashtabula County, Ohio